Isola Razzoli Lighthouse is an active lighthouse located on an 
The island is in the municipality of La Maddalena on the Tyrrhenian Sea.

Description
The tower and the lantern were painted in white, the lantern dome in grey metallic. The lighthouse was abandoned when it started to ruin and was understood that was too much expensive to renovate it. In 2007 a European Commission granted funds for a partial renovation of the building, but it seem that most of the work is to be done. The tower is unpainted, the balcony is white and the lantern dome in grey metallic. The lighthouse is completely automated, powered by a solar unit and managed by the Arcipelago di La Maddalena National Park with the identification code number 1000 E.F.

See also
 List of lighthouses in Italy

References

External links

 Servizio Fari Marina Militare

Lighthouses in Italy
Buildings and structures in Sardinia